Novorossiya (also known as New Russia) was an unrecognised confederation of the Donetsk and Luhansk People's Republics, claiming the territory of the Donetsk and Luhansk oblasts in the Donbas region of eastern Ukraine. On 20 May 2015 the leadership of the Federal State of Novorossiya announced the 'freezing' of the confederation 'project'.

The battle flag is based on the naval jack of the Imperial Russian Navy. Oleksandr Chalenko, who worked as a political journalist in Kyiv, described the flag and explained its symbolism in an item published by Izvestia on 20 March 2014: "It's a red flag with a blue Saint Andrew's cross. The flag of the Russian Navy. Of the Navy, which played a prominent military role in the emergence and establishment of historical Novorossiya."

A white-yellow-black tricolor was presented on 13 August 2014 by Oleg Tsarev as a potential state flag for the confederation of the Donetsk and Luhansk People's Republics. This resembled an upside-down Romanov flag, which was the national flag of the Russian Empire from 1858 to 1883.

War Flag

Similarities with the Confederate battle flag 

Some have noted that the flag's design resembles the Confederate States of America's navy jack and battle flag, known also as the "Dixie flag". Ukrainian political analyst Mikhail Pavliv is credited with having created the flag; Pavliv explains that he had simply stumbled upon the flag online somewhere, and that the leader of the New Russia Party, Pavel Gubarev, later picked it up. However, Gubarev has stated that the inspiration for the flag came from banners used by Cossacks in the 18th century. Vexillologically, the flag is a combination of the flag of the Semirechye Cossacks and the St. Andrew's Flag.

See also
 List of Russian navy flags
 Flags used in Russian-controlled areas of Ukraine
 Russo-Ukrainian War
 Novorussiya

References

External links 
 Novorossiya Republic at Flags of the World

Novorossiya (confederation)
Novorossiya
Novorossiya